Rotolo is an Italian surname. Notable people with the surname include:

Antonio Rotolo (b. 1946), Sicilian mafiosi, an important member of cosa nostra
Carla Rotolo (1941–2014), friend of Bob Dylan and sister of Suze Rotolo
Mary Pezzati Rotolo (1910–1990), author and activist, mother of Suze and Carla Rotolo
, and Italian singer and TV presenter in the late 1970s
Suze Rotolo (1943–2011), one of Bob Dylan's early girlfriends
Tamara Rotolo, Californian mother of Jazmin Grace Grimaldi by Albert II, Prince of Monaco

Italian-language surnames